Mats Seuntjens (born 17 April 1992) is a Dutch professional footballer who plays as an attacking midfielder for Eredivisie club RKC Waalwijk.

Club career
Seuntjens played as a youth for BSV Boeimeer, and at the age of 18 joined the NAC Breda youth academy in 2010 as an under-19 player. He made his professional debut for the club 28 January 2012 in a match against De Graafschap. 

On 30 May 2016, Seuntjens moved to AZ, after an impressing 2015–16 season with NAC where he scored 13 goals and made 14 assists in 35 appearances in the Eerste Divisie. He made his debut for AZ on 28 July in a Europa League qualifier against Greek club PAS Giannina, coming on as a 87th-minute substitute for Joris van Overeem in a 1–0 home win. During his three seasons in Alkmaar, Seuntjens made 110 total appearances in which he scored 11 goals.

On 1 July 2019, Seuntjens signed a two-year contract with Turkish Süper Lig club Gençlerbirliği after having lost his spot in the AZ starting eleven under new head coach Arne Slot. He made his official debut for the club on 17 August as a starter in a 1–0 loss to Rizespor.

He moved to Fortuna Sittard on 15 August 2020 after an unsuccessful spell in Turkey.

On 1 January 2023, Seuntjens moved to RKC Waalwijk, after 2.5 years with Fortuna Sittard.

Personal
His brother is professional footballer Ralf Seuntjens.

References

External links
 
 Voetbal International profile 

1992 births
Living people
Footballers from Breda
Dutch footballers
Association football forwards
Eredivisie players
Eerste Divisie players
Süper Lig players
NAC Breda players
AZ Alkmaar players
Jong AZ players
Fortuna Sittard players
RKC Waalwijk players
Dutch expatriate sportspeople in Turkey
Dutch expatriate footballers
Expatriate footballers in Turkey